Bayview is an unincorporated community in the northwest United States, located in Kootenai County, Idaho, north of Coeur d'Alene. Nearby is Farragut State Park, formerly the Farragut Naval Training Station, a major training facility during World War II.

The U.S. Navy's Acoustic Research Detachment operates from Bayview, testing new submarine and surface ship shapes and subsystems. It is a remote facility of the Naval Surface Warfare Center

History
Bayview's population was 75 in 1909, and was 250 in 1960.

Climate

Parks and recreation

Farragut State Park
At , it is one of Idaho's largest state parks and borders Lake Pend Oreille. The park features a small beach, a trail network connected to Bayview, and disc golf courses. An excellent wildlife viewing area, Farragut is home to mountain goats, whitetail deer, badgers, black bears, coyotes, bobcats, and an occasional elk.

Events and activities
Bayview Daze is the annual summer celebration for the town, usually held in early July.

Bayview is the home location for the Lake Pend Oreille Yacht Club. Lake Pend Oreille Yacht Club is a non-profit organization which promotes racing, cruising and educational activities on Lake Pend Oreille for sailors and people interested in sailing.

Water sports include fishing, boating, water skiing, and swimming. Other attractions are camping, hiking and exploring, biking, with great hunting in the fall.

The Club began in 1977 by Keith Sheckler and others to promote sailing in Sandpoint, Idaho. The Club’s active racing program attracted sailors from all around the Inland Northwest. As its membership grew, its demographics shifted south, as more and more of its members were from Coeur d’Alene and Spokane. Racing at the south end of the lake grew and eventually the Club migrated south too, from Sandpoint to Bayview. To fill the void in the north, Keith Sheckler spearheaded the creation of the Sandpoint Sailing Association (SSA) which cooperates with LPOYC to provide many racing and cruising opportunities on Lake Pend Oreille.

References

4. https://www.bayviewidaho.org/index.html

Unincorporated communities in Kootenai County, Idaho
Unincorporated communities in Idaho